The Farrington-Kaiser-Kalani Complex Area is one of 15 Hawaii Department of Education complex areas in the state of Hawaii, USA. It is part of the Honolulu District and comprises 1 community school, 3 high schools, 4 middle schools, 18 elementary schools, 1 public charter school, and 1 special school.

The current complex superintendent is Donna Kagawa.

Community Schools

High school

Other Complex Areas

Honolulu District
Kaimuki-McKinley-Roosevelt Complex Area

School Complex Areas in Hawaii